Celaenorrhinus humbloti is a species of butterfly in the family Hesperiidae. It is found on Madagascar. The habitat consists of forests.

References

Butterflies described in 1884
humbloti
Butterflies of Africa
Taxa named by Paul Mabille